Trochus erithreus is a species of small sea snail, a marine gastropod mollusc in the family Trochidae, the top snails.

Description
The height of the shell varies between 33 mm and 35 mm, its diameter between 37 mm and 40 mm. The  rather thin and inflated shell has a conical shape and is false-umbilicate. The apex is  acute. The about  7 whorls are somewhat concave and generally traversed by several conspicuously granose lirae in the middle. They are a little gibbous above and below, obliquely undulate below the sutures, and frequently on the periphery also. The whole surface is more or less finely spirally lirate with subgranulose lirae. The convex base of the shell is concentrically lirate with about 7 granose narrow lirae. Their interstices are generally occupied by concentric striae. The color of the shell is cinereous grayish or pinkish, striped and maculated above with reddish; unicolored pinkish or radiately marked below. The large aperture is smooth and pearly within. The basal lip is simple. The oblique columella is very deeply inserted, its entire edge nearly straight, not dentate. The deep umbilical tract is narrow, pearly. bearing a single strong spiral white rib near its base, which does not attain the edge of the columella.

It feeds on algae and is often seen by divers.

Distribution
This species occurs in the Indian Ocean (Aldabra Region), the Red Sea, the Persian Gulf (off Kuwait), the Mediterranean Sea (as a Lessepsian migrant) and in the Northern Atlantic Ocean.

References

 Brocchi (1821). Continuazione e fine del catalogo delle conchiglie raccolte dal Sig. G. Forni nel seno Arabico ed illustrate dal Sig. Brocchi. Biblioteca Italiana : 24: 209–226. page(s):
 Spry, J.F. (1961). The sea shells of Dar es Salaam: Gastropods. Tanganyika Notes and Records 56
 Taylor, J.D. (1973). Provisional list of the mollusca of Aldabra Atoll.
 Bosch D.T., Dance S.P., Moolenbeek R.G. & Oliver P.G. (1995) Seashells of eastern Arabia. Dubai: Motivate Publishing. 296 pp
 Gofas, S.; Le Renard, J.; Bouchet, P. (2001). Mollusca, in: Costello, M.J. et al. (Ed.) (2001). European register of marine species: a check-list of the marine species in Europe and a bibliography of guides to their identification. Collection Patrimoines Naturels, 50: pp. 180–213
 Streftaris, N.; Zenetos, A.; Papathanassiou, E. (2005). Globalisation in marine ecosystems: the story of non-indigenous marine species across European seas. Oceanogr. Mar. Biol. Annu. Rev. 43: 419–453

External links
 

erithreus
Gastropods described in 1821